The Al Ghad ( meaning Tomorrow) is a privately owned and the first independent Arabic daily national newspaper published in Jordan and headquartered in Amman.

History and profile
Al Ghad was founded by Mohammad Alayyan in August 2004. Alayyan is also the chairman of the Al Faridah Specialized Printing, publisher of the daily. As of 2005 Emad Hmoud was the editor-in-chief of the paper.

Militants stormed the paper's headquarters in November 2011, attacking employees. Editor-in-chief Mustafa Saleh's resignation the following month coincided with the dismissal of Jumana Ghunaimat, editor-and-chief of the state-owned al-Rai, by then-Minister of State for Media Affairs and Communication, Rakan Al-Majali. Its editor-in-chief was Jumana Ghunaimat who was appointed to the post in late 2011, through 2018.  Mohammed Sweidan was the managing editor of the daily.

In addition to its print version, it launched online version which has reached a significant number of readers. It was the 10th most visited website for 2010 in the MENA region.

The paper was awarded three prizes in the categories of Best Design, Best Front Page, and Best Electronic Portal in the 7th Asia Media Awards, organized by the World Association of Newspapers and News Publishers (IFRA). In 2018, Al Ghad was named the most influential Arabic newspaper website by Industry Arabic.

Content
The newspaper is organized into five sections:
 Al Ghad Al Urduni (الغد الأردني): for local news of Jordan
 Arabs and the World ( العرب والعالم): covers international and regional news
 Al Tahaddi (التحدي): for sports news
 Economy (اقتصاد): covers international economics and business news
 Hyatuna (حياتنا):  covers health and lifestyle news

See also
List of newspapers in Jordan

References

Newspapers established in 2004
2004 establishments in Jordan
Arabic-language newspapers
Newspapers published in Jordan
Mass media in Amman